WEVR-FM (106.3 FM) is a radio station broadcasting a soft adult contemporary music format licensed to River Falls, Wisconsin, United States. The station is currently owned by Hanten Broadcasting Company.

History

WEVR-FM went on the air September 30, 1970, a year after WEVR AM debuted.

The station programs a soft adult contemporary format, along with local sports coverage, news, and farm updates. It is also an affiliate of the Wisconsin Badgers football, Green Bay Packers, and Milwaukee Brewers radio networks, with WEVR AM airing games that conflict.

The highlight of many listeners each day was the "Time for trade" segment, a 10-minute community event and sale show showed hosted by the local hardware store owner, Fred Benson. He was the owner and operator of Lunds Hardware, a 104-year-old business before it closed in the early 2000s. Benson would mention all community events, offer local items for sale by responding to a phone call, and small engine repair advice by J. Fizz, a local expert on small engine & snowblower repairs, tips, and troubleshooting. J.Fizz's segments became so popular, the station considered offering J.Fizz his own half-hour show each Saturday morning however, J.Fizz had no interest in what he called, "big-time show business". J. Fizz would later go on and provide tips to public radio listeners through the local colleges' radio station WRFW 88.7 for four years before retiring. WEVR-FM is unique as it only has one full-time DJ who covers the operation from 6:00 am until 10:00, seven days a week, 365 days a year.

WEVR-FM's slogan, "Your Good Neighbor in the Friendly Valley" was first played on June 2, 1971, and it continues to this day, making it one of the oldest stations in Western Wisconsin still independently owned & operated.

References

External links

EVR-FM
Soft adult contemporary radio stations in the United States
River Falls, Wisconsin